Coleophora tyrrhaenica is a moth of the family Coleophoridae. It is found in France, Sardinia, Italy, Croatia, Hungary, Romania, Bulgaria, Greece and southern Russia.

Adults are on wing in August.

References

tyrrhaenica
Moths of Europe
Moths described in 1951